Moodnopsis is a genus of snout moths. It was described by Harrison Gray Dyar Jr. in 1914.

Species
 Moodnopsis decipiens Dyar, 1914
 Moodnopsis inornatella
 Moodnopsis inveterella (Dyar, 1919)
 Moodnopsis parallela
 Moodnopsis perangusta
 Moodnopsis portoricensis

References

Phycitinae